Benzene is an organic chemical compound with the molecular formula C6H6. The benzene molecule is composed of six carbon atoms joined in a planar ring with one hydrogen atom attached to each. Because it contains only carbon and hydrogen atoms, benzene is classed as a hydrocarbon.

Benzene is a natural constituent of petroleum and is one of the elementary petrochemicals. Due to the cyclic continuous pi bonds between the carbon atoms, benzene is classed as an aromatic hydrocarbon. Benzene is a colorless and highly flammable liquid with a sweet smell, and is partially responsible for the aroma of gasoline. It is used primarily as a precursor to the manufacture of chemicals with more complex structure, such as ethylbenzene and cumene, of which billions of kilograms are produced annually. Although benzene is a major industrial chemical, it finds limited use in consumer items because of its toxicity.

History

Discovery
The word "benzene" derives from "gum benzoin" (benzoin resin), an aromatic resin known since ancient times in Southeast Asia; and later to European pharmacists and perfumers in the 16th century via trade routes. An acidic material was derived from benzoin by sublimation, and named "flowers of benzoin", or benzoic acid. The hydrocarbon derived from benzoic acid thus acquired the name benzin, benzol, or benzene. Michael Faraday first isolated and identified benzene in 1825 from the oily residue derived from the production of illuminating gas, giving it the name bicarburet of hydrogen. In 1833, Eilhard Mitscherlich produced it by distilling benzoic acid (from gum benzoin) and lime. He gave the compound the name benzin. In 1836, the French chemist Auguste Laurent named the substance "phène"; this word has become the root of the English word "phenol", which is hydroxylated benzene, and "phenyl", the radical formed by abstraction of a hydrogen atom (free radical H•) from benzene.

In 1845, Charles Blachford Mansfield, working under August Wilhelm von Hofmann, isolated benzene from coal tar. Four years later, Mansfield began the first industrial-scale production of benzene, based on the coal-tar method. Gradually, the sense developed among chemists that a number of substances were chemically related to benzene, comprising a diverse chemical family. In 1855, Hofmann used the word "aromatic" to designate this family relationship, after a characteristic property of many of its members. In 1997, benzene was detected in deep space.

Ring formula

The empirical formula for benzene was long known, but its highly polyunsaturated structure, with just one hydrogen atom for each carbon atom, was challenging to determine. Archibald Scott Couper in 1858 and Johann Josef Loschmidt in 1861 suggested possible structures that contained multiple double bonds or multiple rings, but too little evidence was then available to help chemists decide on any particular structure.

In 1865, the German chemist Friedrich August Kekulé published a paper in French (for he was then teaching in Francophone Belgium) suggesting that the structure contained a ring of six carbon atoms with alternating single and double bonds. The next year he published a much longer paper in German on the same subject. Kekulé used evidence that had accumulated in the intervening years—namely, that there always appeared to be only one isomer of any monoderivative of benzene, and that there always appeared to be exactly three isomers of every disubstituted derivative—now understood to correspond to the ortho, meta, and para patterns of arene substitution—to argue in support of his proposed structure. Kekulé's symmetrical ring could explain these curious facts, as well as benzene's 1:1 carbon-hydrogen ratio.

The new understanding of benzene, and hence of all aromatic compounds, proved to be so important for both pure and applied chemistry that in 1890 the German Chemical Society organized an elaborate appreciation in Kekulé's honor, celebrating the twenty-fifth anniversary of his first benzene paper. Here Kekulé spoke of the creation of the theory. He said that he had discovered the ring shape of the benzene molecule after having a reverie or day-dream of a snake biting its own tail (this is a common symbol in many ancient cultures known as the Ouroboros or endless knot). This vision, he said, came to him after years of studying the nature of carbon-carbon bonds. This was seven years after he had solved the problem of how carbon atoms could bond to up to four other atoms at the same time. Curiously, a similar, humorous depiction of benzene had appeared in 1886 in a pamphlet entitled Berichte der Durstigen Chemischen Gesellschaft (Journal of the Thirsty Chemical Society), a parody of the Berichte der Deutschen Chemischen Gesellschaft, only the parody had monkeys seizing each other in a circle, rather than snakes as in Kekulé's anecdote. Some historians have suggested that the parody was a lampoon of the snake anecdote, possibly already well known through oral transmission even if it had not yet appeared in print. Kekulé's 1890 speech in which this anecdote appeared has been translated into English. If the anecdote is the memory of a real event, circumstances mentioned in the story suggest that it must have happened early in 1862.

In 1929, the cyclic nature of benzene was finally confirmed by the crystallographer Kathleen Lonsdale using X-ray diffraction methods. Using large crystals of hexamethylbenzene, a benzene derivative with the same core of six carbon atoms, Lonsdale obtained diffraction patterns. Through calculating more than thirty parameters, Lonsdale demonstrated that the benzene ring could not be anything but a flat hexagon, and provided accurate distances for all carbon-carbon bonds in the molecule.

Nomenclature
The German chemist Wilhelm Körner suggested the prefixes ortho-, meta-, para- to distinguish di-substituted benzene derivatives in 1867; however, he did not use the prefixes to distinguish the relative positions of the substituents on a benzene ring. It was the German chemist Carl Gräbe who, in 1869, first used the prefixes ortho-, meta-, para- to denote specific relative locations of the substituents on a di-substituted aromatic ring (viz, naphthalene). In 1870, the German chemist Viktor Meyer first applied Gräbe's nomenclature to benzene.

Early applications
In the 19th and early 20th centuries, benzene was used as an after-shave lotion because of its pleasant smell. Prior to the 1920s, benzene was frequently used as an industrial solvent, especially for degreasing metal. As its toxicity became obvious, benzene was supplanted by other solvents, especially toluene (methylbenzene), which has similar physical properties but is not as carcinogenic.

In 1903, Ludwig Roselius popularized the use of benzene to decaffeinate coffee. This discovery led to the production of Sanka. This process was later discontinued. Benzene was historically used as a significant component in many consumer products such as liquid wrench, several paint strippers, rubber cements, spot removers, and other products. Manufacture of some of these benzene-containing formulations ceased in about 1950, although Liquid Wrench continued to contain significant amounts of benzene until the late 1970s.

Occurrence
Trace amounts of benzene are found in petroleum and coal. It is a byproduct of the incomplete combustion of many materials. For commercial use, until World War II, much of benzene was obtained as a by-product of coke production (or "coke-oven light oil") for the steel industry. However, in the 1950s, increased demand for benzene, especially from the growing polymers industry, necessitated the production of benzene from petroleum. Today, most benzene comes from the petrochemical industry, with only a small fraction being produced from coal. Benzene molecules have been detected on Mars.

Structure

X-ray diffraction shows that all six carbon-carbon bonds in benzene are of the same length, at 140 picometres (pm). The C–C bond lengths are greater than a double bond (135 pm) but shorter than a single bond (147 pm). This intermediate distance is caused by electron delocalization: the electrons for C=C bonding are distributed equally between each of the six carbon atoms. Benzene has 6 hydrogen atoms, fewer than the corresponding parent alkane, hexane, which has 14. Benzene and cyclohexane have a similar structure, only the ring of delocalized electrons and the loss of one hydrogen per carbon distinguishes it from cyclohexane. The molecule is planar. The molecular orbital description involves the formation of three delocalized π orbitals spanning all six carbon atoms, while the valence bond description involves a superposition of resonance structures. It is likely that this stability contributes to the peculiar molecular and chemical properties known as aromaticity. To accurately reflect the nature of the bonding, benzene is often depicted with a circle inside a hexagonal arrangement of carbon atoms.

Derivatives of benzene occur sufficiently often as a component of organic molecules, so much so that the Unicode Consortium has allocated a symbol in the Miscellaneous Technical block with the code U+232C (⌬) to represent it with three double bonds, and U+23E3 (⏣) for a delocalized version.

Benzene derivatives

Many important chemical compounds are derived from benzene by replacing one or more of its hydrogen atoms with another functional group. Examples of simple benzene derivatives are phenol, toluene, and aniline, abbreviated PhOH, PhMe, and PhNH2, respectively. Linking benzene rings gives biphenyl, C6H5–C6H5. Further loss of hydrogen gives "fused" aromatic hydrocarbons, such as naphthalene, anthracene, phenanthrene, and pyrene. The limit of the fusion process is the hydrogen-free allotrope of carbon, graphite.

In heterocycles, carbon atoms in the benzene ring are replaced with other elements. The most important variations contain nitrogen. Replacing one CH with N gives the compound pyridine, C5H5N. Although benzene and pyridine are structurally related, benzene cannot be converted into pyridine. Replacement of a second CH bond with N gives, depending on the location of the second N, pyridazine, pyrimidine, or pyrazine.

Production
Four chemical processes contribute to industrial benzene production: catalytic reforming, toluene hydrodealkylation, toluene disproportionation, and steam cracking etc. According to the ATSDR Toxicological Profile for benzene, between 1978 and 1981, catalytic reformates accounted for approximately 44–50% of the total U.S benzene production.

Catalytic reforming
In catalytic reforming, a mixture of hydrocarbons with boiling points between 60 and 200 °C is blended with hydrogen gas and then exposed to a bifunctional platinum chloride or rhenium chloride catalyst at 500–525 °C and pressures ranging from 8–50 atm. Under these conditions, aliphatic hydrocarbons form rings and lose hydrogen to become aromatic hydrocarbons. The aromatic products of the reaction are then separated from the reaction mixture (or reformate) by extraction with any one of a number of solvents, including diethylene glycol or sulfolane, and benzene is then separated from the other aromatics by distillation. The extraction step of aromatics from the reformate is designed to produce aromatics with lowest non-aromatic components. Recovery of the aromatics, commonly referred to as BTX (benzene, toluene and xylene isomers), involves such extraction and distillation steps.

In similar fashion to this catalytic reforming, UOP and BP commercialized a method from LPG (mainly propane and butane) to aromatics.

Toluene hydrodealkylation
Toluene hydrodealkylation converts toluene to benzene. In this hydrogen-intensive process, toluene is mixed with hydrogen, then passed over a chromium, molybdenum, or platinum oxide catalyst at 500–650 °C and 20–60 atm pressure. Sometimes, higher temperatures are used instead of a catalyst (at the similar reaction condition). Under these conditions, toluene undergoes dealkylation to benzene and methane:

C6H5CH3 + H2 -> C6H6 + CH4

This irreversible reaction is accompanied by an equilibrium side reaction that produces
biphenyl (aka diphenyl) at higher temperature:

2    + 

If the raw material stream contains much non-aromatic components (paraffins or naphthenes), those are likely decomposed to lower hydrocarbons such as methane, which increases the consumption of hydrogen.

A typical reaction yield exceeds 95%. Sometimes, xylenes and heavier aromatics are used in place of toluene, with similar efficiency.

This is often called "on-purpose" methodology to produce benzene, compared to conventional BTX (benzene-toluene-xylene) extraction processes.

Toluene disproportionation
Toluene disproportionation (TDP) is the conversion of toluene to benzene and xylene.

Given that demand for para-xylene (p-xylene) substantially exceeds demand for other xylene isomers, a refinement of the TDP process called Selective TDP (STDP) may be used. In this process, the xylene stream exiting the TDP unit is approximately 90% p-xylene. In some systems, even the benzene-to-xylenes ratio is modified to favor xylenes.

Steam cracking
Steam cracking is the process for producing ethylene and other alkenes from aliphatic hydrocarbons. Depending on the feedstock used to produce the olefins, steam cracking can produce a benzene-rich liquid by-product called pyrolysis gasoline. Pyrolysis gasoline can be blended with other hydrocarbons as a gasoline additive, or routed through an extraction process to recover BTX aromatics (benzene, toluene and xylenes).

Other methods 
Although of no commercial significance, many other routes to benzene exist. Phenol and halobenzenes can be reduced with metals. Benzoic acid and its salts undergo decarboxylation to benzene.  The reaction of the diazonium compound derived from aniline with hypophosphorus acid gives benzene. Alkyne trimerisation of acetylene gives benzene. Complete decarboxylation of mellitic acid gives benzene.

Uses
Benzene is used mainly as an intermediate to make other chemicals, above all ethylbenzene (and other alkylbenzenes), cumene, cyclohexane, and nitrobenzene. In 1988 it was reported that two-thirds of all chemicals on the American Chemical Society's lists contained at least one benzene ring. More than half of the entire benzene production is processed into ethylbenzene, a precursor to styrene, which is used to make polymers and plastics like polystyrene. Some 20% of the benzene production is used to manufacture cumene, which is needed to produce phenol and acetone for resins and adhesives. Cyclohexane consumes around 10% of the world's benzene production; it is primarily used in the manufacture of nylon fibers, which are processed into textiles and engineering plastics. Smaller amounts of benzene are used to make some types of rubbers, lubricants, dyes, detergents, drugs, explosives, and pesticides. In 2013, the biggest consumer country of benzene was China, followed by the USA. Benzene production is currently expanding in the Middle East and in Africa, whereas production capacities in Western Europe and North America are stagnating.

Toluene is now often used as a substitute for benzene, for instance as a fuel additive. The solvent-properties of the two are similar, but toluene is less toxic and has a wider liquid range. Toluene is also processed into benzene.

Component of gasoline
As a gasoline (petrol) additive, benzene increases the octane rating and reduces knocking. As a consequence, gasoline often contained several percent benzene before the 1950s, when tetraethyl lead replaced it as the most widely used antiknock additive. With the global phaseout of leaded gasoline, benzene has made a comeback as a gasoline additive in some nations. In the United States, concern over its negative health effects and the possibility of benzene entering the groundwater has led to stringent regulation of gasoline's benzene content, with limits typically around 1%. European petrol specifications now contain the same 1% limit on benzene content. The United States Environmental Protection Agency introduced new regulations in 2011 that lowered the benzene content in gasoline to 0.62%. 

In many European languages, the word for petroleum or gasoline is an exact cognate of "benzene".

Reactions
The most common reactions of benzene involve substitution of a proton by other groups. Electrophilic aromatic substitution is a general method of derivatizing benzene. Benzene is sufficiently nucleophilic that it undergoes substitution by acylium ions and alkyl carbocations to give substituted derivatives.

The most widely practiced example of this reaction is the ethylation of benzene.

Approximately 24,700,000 tons were produced in 1999. Highly instructive but of far less industrial significance is the Friedel-Crafts alkylation of benzene (and many other aromatic rings) using an alkyl halide in the presence of a strong Lewis acid catalyst. Similarly, the Friedel-Crafts acylation is a related example of electrophilic aromatic substitution. The reaction involves the acylation of benzene (or many other aromatic rings) with an acyl chloride using a strong Lewis acid catalyst such as aluminium chloride or Iron(III) chloride.

Sulfonation, chlorination, nitration
Using electrophilic aromatic substitution, many functional groups are introduced onto the benzene framework.  Sulfonation of benzene involves the use of oleum, a mixture of sulfuric acid with sulfur trioxide. Sulfonated benzene derivatives are useful detergents.  In nitration, benzene reacts with nitronium ions (NO2+), which is a strong electrophile produced by combining sulfuric and nitric acids.  Nitrobenzene is the precursor to aniline.  Chlorination is achieved with chlorine to give chlorobenzene in the presence of a Lewis acid catalyst such as aluminium tri-chloride.

Hydrogenation
Via hydrogenation, benzene and its derivatives convert to cyclohexane and derivatives. This reaction is achieved by the use of high pressures of hydrogen in the presence of heterogeneous catalysts, such as finely divided nickel. Whereas alkenes can be hydrogenated near room temperatures, benzene and related compounds are more reluctant substrates, requiring temperatures >100 °C. This reaction is practiced on a large scale industrially. In the absence of the catalyst, benzene is impervious to hydrogen.  Hydrogenation cannot be stopped to give cyclohexene or cyclohexadienes as these are superior substrates. Birch reduction, a non catalytic process, however selectively hydrogenates benzene to the diene.

Metal complexes
Benzene is an excellent ligand in the organometallic chemistry of low-valent metals. Important examples include the sandwich and half-sandwich complexes, respectively, Cr(C6H6)2 and [RuCl2(C6H6)]2.

Health effects

Benzene is classified as a carcinogen, which increases the risk of cancer and other illnesses, and is also a notorious cause of bone marrow failure. Substantial quantities of epidemiologic, clinical, and laboratory data link benzene to aplastic anemia, acute leukemia, bone marrow abnormalities and cardiovascular disease.  The specific hematologic malignancies that benzene is associated with include: acute myeloid leukemia (AML), aplastic anemia, myelodysplastic syndrome (MDS), acute lymphoblastic leukemia (ALL), and chronic myeloid leukemia (CML).

The American Petroleum Institute (API) stated in 1948 that "it is generally considered that the only absolutely safe concentration for benzene is zero". There is no safe exposure level; even tiny amounts can cause harm.  The US Department of Health and Human Services (DHHS) classifies benzene as a human carcinogen. Long-term exposure to excessive levels of benzene in the air causes leukemia, a potentially fatal cancer of the blood-forming organs. In particular, acute myeloid leukemia or acute nonlymphocytic leukemia (AML & ANLL) is caused by benzene. IARC rated benzene as "known to be carcinogenic to humans" (Group 1).

As benzene is ubiquitous in gasoline and hydrocarbon fuels that are in use everywhere, human exposure to benzene is a global health problem.  Benzene targets the liver, kidney, lung, heart and brain and can cause DNA strand breaks and chromosomal damage. Benzene causes cancer in animals including humans. Benzene has been shown to cause cancer in both sexes of multiple species of laboratory animals exposed via various routes.

Exposure to benzene
According to the Agency for Toxic Substances and Disease Registry (ATSDR) (2007), benzene is both a synthetically-made and naturally occurring chemical from processes that include: volcanic eruptions, wild fires, synthesis of chemicals such as phenol, production of synthetic fibers, and fabrication of rubbers, lubricants, pesticides, medications, and dyes. The major sources of benzene exposure are tobacco smoke, automobile service stations, exhaust from motor vehicles, and industrial emissions; however, ingestion and dermal absorption of benzene can also occur through contact with contaminated water. Benzene is hepatically metabolized and excreted in the urine. Measurement of air and water levels of benzene is accomplished through collection via activated charcoal tubes, which are then analyzed with a gas chromatograph. The measurement of benzene in humans can be accomplished via urine, blood, and breath tests; however, all of these have their limitations because benzene is rapidly metabolized in the human body.

Exposure to benzene may lead progressively to aplastic anemia, leukaemia, and multiple myeloma.

OSHA regulates levels of benzene in the workplace. The maximum allowable amount of benzene in workroom air during an 8-hour workday, 40-hour workweek is 1 ppm. As benzene can cause cancer, NIOSH recommends that all workers wear special breathing equipment when they are likely to be exposed to benzene at levels exceeding the recommended (8-hour) exposure limit of 0.1 ppm.

Benzene exposure limits
The United States Environmental Protection Agency has set a maximum contaminant level for benzene in drinking water at 0.0005 mg/L (5 ppb), as promulgated via the U.S. National Primary Drinking Water Regulations. This regulation is based on preventing benzene leukemogenesis. The maximum contaminant level goal (MCLG), a nonenforceable health goal that would allow an adequate margin of safety for the prevention of adverse effects, is zero benzene concentration in drinking water. The EPA requires that spills or accidental releases into the environment of 10 pounds (4.5 kg) or more of benzene be reported.

The U.S. Occupational Safety and Health Administration (OSHA) has set a permissible exposure limit of 1 part of benzene per million parts of air (1 ppm) in the workplace during an 8-hour workday, 40-hour workweek. The short term exposure limit for airborne benzene is 5 ppm for 15 minutes. These legal limits were based on studies demonstrating compelling evidence of health risk to workers exposed to benzene. The risk from exposure to 1 ppm for a working lifetime has been estimated as 5 excess leukemia deaths per 1,000 employees exposed. (This estimate assumes no threshold for benzene's carcinogenic effects.) OSHA has also established an action level of 0.5 ppm to encourage even lower exposures in the workplace.

The U.S. National Institute for Occupational Safety and Health (NIOSH) revised the Immediately Dangerous to Life and Health (IDLH) concentration for benzene to 500 ppm. The current NIOSH definition for an IDLH condition, as given in the NIOSH Respirator Selection Logic, is one that poses a threat of exposure to airborne contaminants when that exposure is likely to cause death or immediate or delayed permanent adverse health effects or prevent escape from such an environment. The purpose of establishing an IDLH value is (1) to ensure that the worker can escape from a given contaminated environment in the event of failure of the respiratory protection equipment and (2) is considered a maximum level above which only a highly reliable breathing apparatus providing maximum worker protection is permitted. In September 1995, NIOSH issued a new policy for developing recommended exposure limits (RELs) for substances, including carcinogens. As benzene can cause cancer, NIOSH recommends that all workers wear special breathing equipment when they are likely to be exposed to benzene at levels exceeding the REL (10-hour) of 0.1 ppm. The NIOSH short-term exposure limit (STEL – 15 min) is 1 ppm.

American Conference of Governmental Industrial Hygienists (ACGIH) adopted Threshold Limit Values (TLVs) for benzene at 0.5 ppm TWA and 2.5 ppm STEL.

Toxicology

Biomarkers of exposure
Several tests can determine exposure to benzene. Benzene itself can be measured in breath, blood or urine, but such testing is usually limited to the first 24 hours post-exposure due to the relatively rapid removal of the chemical by exhalation or biotransformation. Most people in developed countries have measureable baseline levels of benzene and other aromatic petroleum hydrocarbons in their blood. In the body, benzene is enzymatically converted to a series of oxidation products including muconic acid, phenylmercapturic acid, phenol, catechol, hydroquinone and 1,2,4-trihydroxybenzene. Most of these metabolites have some value as biomarkers of human exposure, since they accumulate in the urine in proportion to the extent and duration of exposure, and they may still be present for some days after exposure has ceased. The current ACGIH biological exposure limits for occupational exposure are 500 μg/g creatinine for muconic acid and 25 μg/g creatinine for phenylmercapturic acid in an end-of-shift urine specimen.

Biotransformations
Even if it is not a common substrate for metabolism, benzene can be oxidized by both bacteria and eukaryotes. In bacteria, dioxygenase enzyme can add an oxygen to the ring, and the unstable product is immediately reduced (by NADH) to a cyclic diol with two double bonds, breaking the aromaticity. Next, the diol is newly reduced by NADH to catechol. The catechol is then metabolized to acetyl CoA and succinyl CoA, used by organisms mainly in the citric acid cycle for energy production.

The pathway for the metabolism of benzene is complex and begins in the liver.  Several enzymes are involved.  These include cytochrome P450 2E1 (CYP2E1), quinine oxidoreductase (NQ01 or DT-diaphorase or NAD(P)H dehydrogenase (quinone 1)), GSH, and myeloperoxidase (MPO).  CYP2E1 is involved at multiple steps: converting benzene to oxepin (benzene oxide), phenol to hydroquinone, and hydroquinone to both benzenetriol and catechol.  Hydroquinone, benzenetriol and catechol are converted to polyphenols.  In the bone marrow, MPO converts these polyphenols to benzoquinones.  These intermediates and metabolites induce genotoxicity by multiple mechanisms including inhibition of topoisomerase II (which maintains chromosome structure), disruption of microtubules (which maintains cellular structure and organization), generation of oxygen free radicals (unstable species) that may lead to point mutations, increasing oxidative stress, inducing DNA strand breaks, and altering DNA methylation (which can affect gene expression). NQ01 and GSH shift metabolism away from toxicity.  NQ01 metabolizes benzoquinone toward polyphenols (counteracting the effect of MPO).  GSH is involved with the formation of phenylmercapturic acid.

Genetic polymorphisms in these enzymes may induce loss of function or gain of function.  For example, mutations in CYP2E1 increase activity and result in increased generation of toxic metabolites.  NQ01 mutations result in loss of function and may result in decreased detoxification.  Myeloperoxidase mutations result in loss of function and may result in decreased generation of toxic metabolites.  GSH mutations or deletions result in loss of function and result in decreased detoxification. These genes may be targets for genetic screening for susceptibility to benzene toxicity.

Molecular toxicology
The paradigm of toxicological assessment of benzene is shifting towards the domain of molecular toxicology as it allows understanding of fundamental biological mechanisms in a better way. Glutathione seems to play an important role by protecting against benzene-induced DNA breaks and it is being identified as a new biomarker for exposure and effect. Benzene causes chromosomal aberrations in the peripheral blood leukocytes and bone marrow explaining the higher incidence of leukemia and multiple myeloma caused by chronic exposure. These aberrations can be monitored using fluorescent in situ hybridization (FISH) with DNA probes to assess the effects of benzene along with the hematological tests as markers of hematotoxicity. Benzene metabolism involves enzymes coded for by polymorphic genes. Studies have shown that genotype at these loci may influence susceptibility to the toxic effects of benzene exposure. Individuals carrying variant of NAD(P)H:quinone oxidoreductase 1 (NQO1), microsomal epoxide hydrolase (EPHX) and deletion of the glutathione S-transferase T1 (GSTT1) showed a greater frequency of DNA single-stranded breaks.

Biological oxidation and carcinogenic activity
One way of understanding the carcinogenic effects of benzene is by examining the products of biological oxidation. Pure benzene, for example, oxidizes in the body to produce an epoxide, benzene oxide, which is not excreted readily and can interact with DNA to produce harmful mutations.

Routes of exposure

Inhalation
Outdoor air may contain low levels of benzene from automobile service stations, wood smoke, tobacco smoke, the transfer of gasoline, exhaust from motor vehicles, and industrial emissions. About 50% of the entire nationwide (United States) exposure to benzene results from smoking tobacco or from exposure to tobacco smoke.  After smoking 32 cigarettes per day, the smoker would take in about 1.8 milligrams (mg) of benzene. This amount is about 10 times the average daily intake of benzene by nonsmokers.

Inhaled benzene is primarily expelled unchanged through exhalation. In a human study 16.4 to 41.6% of retained benzene was eliminated through the lungs within five to seven hours after a two- to three-hour exposure to 47 to 110 ppm and only 0.07 to 0.2% of the remaining benzene was excreted unchanged in the urine. After exposure to 63 to 405 mg/m3 of benzene for 1 to 5 hours, 51 to 87% was excreted in the urine as phenol over a period of 23 to 50 hours. In another human study, 30% of absorbed dermally applied benzene, which is primarily metabolized in the liver, was excreted as phenol in the urine.

Exposure from soft drinks

Under specific conditions and in the presence of other chemicals benzoic acid (a preservative) and ascorbic acid (Vitamin C) may interact to produce benzene. In March 2006, the official Food Standards Agency in United Kingdom conducted a survey of 150 brands of soft drinks. It found that four contained benzene levels above World Health Organization limits. The affected batches were removed from sale. Similar problems were reported by the FDA in the United States.

Contamination of water supply
In 2005, the water supply to the city of Harbin in China with a population of almost nine million people, was cut off because of a major benzene exposure. Benzene leaked into the Songhua River, which supplies drinking water to the city, after an explosion at a China National Petroleum Corporation (CNPC) factory in the city of Jilin on 13 November 2005.

When plastic water pipes are subject to high heat, the water may be contaminated with benzene.

Genocide
The Nazis used benzene administered via injection as one of their many methods for killing.

See also

 BTEX
 Industrial Union Department v. American Petroleum Institute
 Six-membered aromatic rings with one carbon replaced by another element: borabenzene, silabenzene, germabenzene, stannabenzene, pyridine, phosphorine, arsabenzene, bismabenzene, pyrylium, thiopyrylium, selenopyrylium, telluropyrylium

Explanatory notes

References

External links 

 Benzene at The Periodic Table of Videos (University of Nottingham)
 International Chemical Safety Card 0015
 USEPA Summary of Benzene Toxicity
 NIOSH Pocket Guide to Chemical Hazards
 
 Dept. of Health and Human Services: TR-289: Toxicology and Carcinogenesis Studies of Benzene
 Video Podcast of Sir John Cadogan giving a lecture on Benzene since Faraday, in 1991
 Substance profile
 
 NLM Hazardous Substances Databank – Benzene

 
Annulenes
Aromatic hydrocarbons
Aromatic solvents
Carcinogens
Commodity chemicals
GABAA receptor positive allosteric modulators
Hazardous air pollutants
Hydrocarbon solvents
IARC Group 1 carcinogens
Immunotoxins
Mutagens
Occupational safety and health
Petrochemicals
Simple aromatic rings
Six-membered rings
Soil contamination
Sweet-smelling chemicals
Teratogens